Natalie Smith (born 9 December 1991) is a Brazilian actress, producer, director and screenwriter who became known for acting in productions with The Stripper., Melhor Amiga da Noiva, Poesias Para Gael and Chicas Carioca

Career 

Natalie debuted as an actress in 2005 in the theater starring in the play "A Noiva Cadaver", in 2012 she acted in "O Recruta Dennis", in 2017 she acted in the series "Perigosos" and in the film "Poesias Para Gael" as Eline, the anatgonista of plot. In 2018, she acted in the feature film "Chicas Cariocas", directed by Wolf Maia, playing the character Paula. In 2017 she starred in the series "Melhor Amiga da Noiva", the most watched LGBT series in Latin America on YouTube. From 2019 she started to star in the series "The Stripper". In 2022, she and also director Priscilla Pugliese have been directing Stupid Wife which has been a successful webseries around the world.

Filmography

References

External links
 

1991 births
Living people
21st-century Brazilian actresses
Brazilian television actresses